Richard M. Siddoway (born 1940) was a member of the Utah House of Representatives.  Siddoway is also the author of several books including the New York Times bestseller The Christmas Wish.

Biography 
Siddoway was born in Salt Lake City and raised in Bountiful, Utah. He and his wife Janice have eight children. He has been an educator for over forty years and for a time was the principal of the Electronic High School for the Utah State Department of Education.

In 1998 The Christmas Wish was adapted into a CBS movie. Siddoway has also written several other books with Christmas themes such as Twelve Tales of Christmas, Christmas of the Cherry Snow, and The Christmas Quest. He has also written other books such as Degrees of Glory, Mom and Other Great Women I Have Known, Habits of the Heart and The Hut in The Tree in The Woods.

From 1996 to 2005 Siddoway served as president of the Bountiful Utah Val Verda Stake of the Church of Jesus Christ of Latter-day Saints (LDS Church). Prior to his call as a stake president Siddoway had served as a bishop in the LDS Church.

See also
 54th Utah State Legislature

Notes

References 
 http://www.ldsfilm.com/bio/bioS2.html
 http://lds.about.com/cs/productreviews/gr/degreesofglory.htm
 http://www.cedarfort.com/author/Siddoway.html

1940 births
American leaders of the Church of Jesus Christ of Latter-day Saints
Members of the Utah House of Representatives
Living people
American male writers
21st-century American politicians
Latter Day Saints from Utah